Katchal (Katchall, Katchál, Kachel), or Tehnu (Tēhnyu), is a Nicobarese language spoken in the central Nicobar Islands. Apart from the dialect of Trinket (Trinkat, Trinkut, or Lâfūl), it is not mutually intelligible with the other Central Nicobarese languages. The population of Trinket was evacuated to Nancowry and Camorta after the 2004 tsunami, and can be expected to disappear as speakers assimilate.

References

Languages of India

Nicobarese languages

fr:Nancowry (langue)